The Rally of the Lakes is an on-road rallying event held in the south-west of Republic of Ireland. It takes place each year on May bank holiday weekend. Organized by Killarney and District Motor Club, the rally has been running since 1979. Traditionally, it starts in Killarney and runs across County Kerry. For a number of years it has been the third/fourth round of the Irish Tarmac Rally Championship. Since 2011 it has been sponsored by vehicle check company Cartell and known as the Cartell.ie Rally of the Lakes.

History

2020-2021
The event was planned to take place on 2–3 May 2020. 
On 12 March all motorsports events were postponed in the light of the coronavirus pandemic. On 20 March, Motorsport Ireland issued a statement that all motorsport events are suspended until 1 June 2020.
 On 28 April the Tarmac Rally Organisers' Association announced that the 2020 Irish Tarmac Rally Championship is cancelled. The event can still go ahead anyway, but will not be a counting round of the ITRC. No further announcements came from the club, the event did not take place. Due to ongoing COVID-19 pandemic the 2021 event was also cancelled.

Previous winners

Partners and Sponsors
 Killarney and District Motor Club
 The Gleneagle Hotel, Killarney
 Ordnance Survey Ireland
 Rentokill Initial
 Aherns.ie Motor Group

References

External links
 Official website
 Organizing Motor Club
 Watch Rally Of the Lakes videos

Rally competitions in Ireland
1979 establishments in Ireland
Motorsport competitions in Ireland